State Highway 78 (SH-78) is a state highway in Idaho from SH-55 in Marsing to I-84 Business Loop in Hammett

Route description
SH-78 starts at the intersection with SH-55 in Marsing and provides access to sites south of the Snake River from there to Bruneau and a few along the north side via SH-167 from Grand View.  SH-78 provides access to Bruneau Dunes State Park and itself crosses the Snake into Elmore County before reaching its eastern terminus at Hammett.

History
The basic route of today's SH-78 from Marsing to Bruneau was in place as early as the mid-1930s, mostly as unimproved roads with a few all-weather gravel segments near Bruneau, Grand View and north of Murphy (a segment originally part of SH-45), and some paved segments near Marsing as of the 1937 map.

Major junctions

References

078
Transportation in Owyhee County, Idaho
Transportation in Elmore County, Idaho